Métabief is a commune in the Doubs department in the Bourgogne-Franche-Comté region in eastern France.

Geography

Population

Tourism
Métabief is known for its winter sports, but it is also a center for tourism in the summer with hiking, mountain biking, hang gliding, mountain climbing, and spelunking. It is one of the six communes that operate the Métabief-Mont-d'Or ski resort.

Gallery

See also
 Communes of the Doubs department

References

External links

 Métabief on the intercommunal Web site of the department 

Communes of Doubs